Pakistan competed at the 2008 Asian Beach Games held in Bali, Indonesia from October 18, 2008 to October 26, 2008. Pakistan finished with 2 gold medals, 2 silver medals, and 3 bronze medals and the 2 gold medals taken by M Taseen Imran.

Medalists

Medal Tally by Sport 

Nations at the 2008 Asian Beach Games
2008
Asian Beach Games